The Australian Family Party is a political party registered in South Australia. It fielded six candidates in the 2022 South Australian state election which was held on 19 March 2022. In its first appearance in the state election, it garnered 0.28% of the vote. It is considered a fringe party by most political analysts.

History
Former Family First Party senator Bob Day launched the Australian Family Party in October 2020. He said it was to counter the Australian Greens and the disappointment of the major parties. He said it was based on six key principles:
Family resilience
Family economics
Family technology
Free to speak
Free to believe
Free to work

The party was registered by the Electoral Commission of South Australia on 11 November 2021.

References

External links

Political parties in South Australia
Political parties established in 2021
2021 establishments in Australia